Tinsel is a Nigerian soap opera that began airing in August 2008. On 23 May 2013, the show's 1000th episode aired. It has been called "the most successful television drama on Nigerian television in recent times".
On 21 Jan 2021, the show's 3000th episode aired.

Plot summary
Tinsel'''s plot revolves around two rival film companies: Reel Studios, founded by Fred Ade-Williams (Victor Olaotan), and Odyssey Pictures, headed by Brenda "Nana" Mensah (Funmilola Aofiyebi-Raimi). Tinsel is a tale of drama, romance, betrayal and triumph. The show returned for its eighth season on 25 May 2015.

Cast
Matilda Obaseki  as Angela Dede
Funlola Aofiyebi-Raimi as Brenda Nana Mensah (2009 – present)
Ireti Doyle as Sheila Ade-Williams
Linda Ejiofor as Bimpe
Kalu Ikeagwu as Masters
Anne Njemanze as Sankey
Ashionye Michelle Raccah as Monica Ade-Williams
Funmi Holder as Amaka Ade-Williams
Tomi Odunsi as Salewa
Yewande Lawal as Shoshanna
Dozie Onyiriuka as Freddy
Abiola Segun-Williams as Titi (2008 – present)
Florence Uwaleke as Ene (2008 – present)
Ike Okechukwu as Chuks Obi
Charles Ujomu as Frank (2008 – present)
Oghenekaro Itene as Wedding Planner
Ibrahim Suleiman as Damini
Nini Mbonu as Vicky 
Jumoke Bello as Peju
Ifeanyi William as Obiora
Paul Barnaby Ephraim "Jaypaul" as Adu

Day Players
Kunle Remi as Zane
Tope Tedela
Kolade Shasi as Gym Coach
Yemisi Fancy as Helen
Christina Okorojie as Yvonne
Nancy Isime as Serena
Mena Sodje as Pippa
Cheng Fuller as Barrister Taylor
Sophie Kings-Okoli as Auntie Kemi

ProductionTinsel'' was in pre-production for over ninety months.
Over 500 actors were auditioned for the lead role of Fred Ade-Williams before the decision to cast Victor Olaotan was made. As of June 2013, the show's production cost per minute is 900 dollars, and total costs have exceeded four billion naira. The show was shot in a studio in Ojota, Lagos until March 2013 when a fire destroyed that location. Since then the show has been shot at a studio and a private residence in Ikeja, Lagos.

It airs on AM Urban and AM Family.

Awards and nominations

References

External links

Tinsel on Demand Africa

2008 Nigerian television series debuts
Nigerian television soap operas
2000s Nigerian television series
2010s Nigerian television series
Television shows set in Lagos
M-Net original programming